In number theory, Goldbach's weak conjecture, also known as the odd Goldbach conjecture, the ternary Goldbach problem, or the 3-primes problem, states that

 Every odd number greater than 5 can be expressed as the sum of three primes. (A prime may be used more than once in the same sum.)

This conjecture is called "weak" because if Goldbach's strong conjecture (concerning sums of two primes) is proven, then this would also be true. For if every even number greater than 4 is the sum of two odd primes, adding 3 to each even number greater than 4 will produce the odd numbers greater than 7 (and 7 itself is equal to 2+2+3).

In 2013, Harald Helfgott released a proof of Goldbach's weak conjecture. As of 2018, the proof is widely accepted in the mathematics community, but it has not yet been published in a peer-reviewed journal. The proof was accepted for publication in the Annals of Mathematics Studies series in 2015, and has been undergoing further review and revision since; fully-refereed chapters in close to final form are being made public in the process.

Some state the conjecture as
Every odd number greater than 7 can be expressed as the sum of three odd primes.
This version excludes 7 = 2+2+3 because this requires the even prime 2. On odd numbers larger than 7 it is slightly stronger as it also excludes sums like 17 = 2+2+13, which are allowed in the other formulation. Helfgott's proof covers both versions of the conjecture. Like the other formulation, this one also immediately follows from Goldbach's strong conjecture.

Origins

The conjecture originated in correspondence between Christian Goldbach and Leonhard Euler. One formulation of the strong Goldbach conjecture, equivalent to the more common one in terms of sums of two primes, is 
Every integer greater than 5 can be written as the sum of three primes.

The weak conjecture is simply this statement restricted to the case where the integer is odd (and possibly with the added requirement that the three primes in the sum be odd).

Timeline of results
In 1923, Hardy and Littlewood showed that, assuming the generalized Riemann hypothesis, the weak Goldbach conjecture is true for all sufficiently large odd numbers. In 1937, Ivan Matveevich Vinogradov eliminated the dependency on the generalised Riemann hypothesis and proved directly (see Vinogradov's theorem) that all sufficiently large odd numbers can be expressed as the sum of three primes. Vinogradov's original proof, as it used the ineffective Siegel–Walfisz theorem, did not give a bound for "sufficiently large"; his student K. Borozdkin (1956) derived that  is large enough. The integer part of this number has 4,008,660 decimal digits, so checking every number under this figure would be completely infeasible.

In 1997, Deshouillers, Effinger, te Riele and Zinoviev published a result showing that the generalized Riemann hypothesis implies Goldbach's weak conjecture for all numbers. This result combines a general statement valid for numbers greater than 1020 with an extensive computer search of the small cases.  Saouter also conducted a computer search covering the same cases at approximately the same time.

Olivier Ramaré in 1995 showed that every even number n ≥ 4 is in fact the sum of at most six primes, from which it follows that every odd number n ≥ 5 is the sum of at most seven primes. Leszek Kaniecki showed every odd integer is a sum of at most five primes, under the Riemann Hypothesis. In 2012, Terence Tao proved this without the Riemann Hypothesis; this improves both results.

The exponent is still much too large to admit checking all smaller numbers by computer. (Computer searches have only reached as far as 1018 for the strong Goldbach conjecture, and not much further than that for the weak Goldbach conjecture.)

In 2012 and 2013, Peruvian mathematician Harald Helfgott released a pair of papers improving major and minor arc estimates sufficiently to unconditionally prove the weak Goldbach conjecture. Here, the major arcs  is the union of intervals  around the rationals  where  is a constant. Minor arcs  are defined to be .

References

Additive number theory
Analytic number theory
Conjectures about prime numbers
Conjectures that have been proved
Computer-assisted proofs

ru:Проблема Гольдбаха#Тернарная проблема Гольдбаха